Alexandra Antonova (born 1991) is a Russian water polo player.

At the 2012 Summer Olympics, she competed for the Russia women's national water polo team in the women's event. 
She participated at the 2011 World Aquatics Championships, and 2015 World Aquatics Championships.

See also
 List of World Aquatics Championships medalists in water polo

References

External links
 

Russian female water polo players
1991 births
Living people
Olympic water polo players of Russia
Water polo players at the 2012 Summer Olympics
World Aquatics Championships medalists in water polo
Universiade medalists in water polo
Universiade bronze medalists for Russia
Medalists at the 2009 Summer Universiade
Medalists at the 2013 Summer Universiade
21st-century Russian women